Carl Greenwood (born March 11, 1972) is a former American football defensive back. He played for the New York Jets from 1995 to 1996.

References

1972 births
Living people
American football defensive backs
UCLA Bruins football players
New York Jets players